Monopoly is a Nintendo 64 video game based on the board game Monopoly, released on December 18, 1999. Developed by Mind's Eye Productions and published by Hasbro Interactive, this title was one of many inspired by the property.

Gameplay 
The game contains very similar gameplay to the board game it is based on, with various physical tasks being replaced by automation and digital representations.

Critical reception 

IGN reviewer Aaron Boulding thought the ability to customise the game according to house rules was an "endearing" feature, and appreciated that it kept the spirit of the board game it was based on. Nintendo Power Magazine praised certain aspects of the game, but thought there wasn't enough visual contrast between the different squares on the board. Nintendojo thought the adaptation was "too true" to its source material and was disappointed it didn't contain gameplay such as mini games and skill events. HonestGamers felt that the interface was "overly complicated" and "clumsy". French review site X64 gave the game a rating of 50/100.

References

External links 

1999 video games
Hasbro games
Monopoly video games
North America-exclusive video games
Nintendo 64 games
Nintendo 64-only games
Video games developed in the United Kingdom
Multiplayer and single-player video games
Mind's Eye Productions games